Klara (stylized as KLARA., born Klára Vytisková; 3 May 1985) is a Czech singer. She was named Female Singer of the Year at the 2015 Anděl Awards. She is the daughter of bass guitarist Vladimír Vytiska. Klara was a judge on the fourth season of Czech and Slovak SuperStar. She previously performed as part of band Toxique.

Discography

Studio albums
2015: Home

Awards and nominations

References

External links

1985 births
Living people
21st-century Czech women singers
Musicians from Prague